Tug Fork Wildlife Management Area (WMA) is located about 10 miles northwest of Welch, West Virginia in McDowell County. The WMA is heavily forested, primarily with mixed hardwoods and yellow poplar/black cherry forests in the coves. The WMA is accessed from U.S. Route 52 at Premier. Several tracks and jeep trails provide walking access into the Tug Fork WMA from U.S. Route 52.

Hunting and fishing

Hunting opportunities in Tug Fork WMA include bear, deer, grouse, squirrel, and turkey.

Tug Fork provides fishing opportunities for warm-water species.

Camping is not available at the WMA.

See also

Animal conservation
Hunting
fishing
List of West Virginia wildlife management areas

References

External links
West Virginia DNR District 4 Wildlife Management Areas
West Virginia hunting regulations
West Virginia Fishing Regulations

Wildlife management areas of West Virginia
Protected areas of McDowell County, West Virginia
IUCN Category V